Parenchelyurus hepburni, Hepburn's blenny or the bluespotted blenny, is a species of combtooth blenny found in coral reefs in the Pacific  and Indian Ocean.  This species reaches a length of  TL. The Specific name (zoology) honours the United States Navy officer Lieutenant A.J. Hepburn who was the executive officer on board the U.S.S. Albatross, a U.S. Bureau of Fisheries steamer and the ship from which the type was collected.

Gallery

References

hepburni
Fish described in 1908